Healey is part of the Metropolitan Borough of Rochdale, Greater Manchester, England. Historically part of Lancashire, it includes Shawclough, Syke and Nook Farm and the rest of the land known as Healey on the right side of Whitworth Road (A671) after Gale Street up to Healey Corner (Whitworth/Rochdale boundary). The population of this Rochdale ward at the 2011 census was 10,411.

References

Areas of the Metropolitan Borough of Rochdale